Delwadi is a village in the Karmala taluka of Solapur district in Maharashtra state, India.

Demographics
Covering  and comprising 218 households at the time of the 2011 census of India, Delwadi had a population of 1054. There were 555 males and 499 females, with 119 people being aged six or younger.

References

Villages in Karmala taluka